Ronaldo Lima Duarte Lopes (born 8 June 1998) is a Dutch football player of Cape Verdean descent. He plays for HV & CV Quick.

Club career
He made his Eerste Divisie debut for FC Den Bosch on 18 August 2017 in a game against Jong AZ.

Personal life
He is a younger brother of Mailson Lima Duarte Lopes.

References

External links
 

1998 births
Dutch sportspeople of Cape Verdean descent
Living people
Dutch footballers
Dutch expatriate footballers
FC Den Bosch players
Eerste Divisie players
Tercera División players
Derde Divisie players
Association football forwards
Dutch expatriate sportspeople in Spain
Expatriate footballers in Spain